This table displays the top-rated primetime television series of the 1981–82 season as measured by Nielsen Media Research.

References

1981 in American television
1982 in American television
1981-related lists
1982-related lists
Lists of American television series